This list of Westminster Theological Seminary people includes notable faculty, staff, and alumni of Westminster Theological Seminary.

Faculty
Current and past resident faculty members include:

Presidents
 Edmund Clowney
 George C. Fuller
 Peter Lillback
 Samuel T. Logan

Professors
 Jay E. Adams
 Oswald Thompson Allis
 Gregory Beale
 Stephen Coleman
 Harvie M. Conn
 Brandon Crowe
 John Currie
 D. Clair Davis
 Ray Dillard
 Iain Duguid
 William Edgar
 Peter Enns
 Sinclair Ferguson
 Sandy Finlayson
 John Frame
 Richard Gaffin
 Richard Gamble
 David Garner
 John Gerstner
 Jonathan Gibson
 Robert Godfrey
 Douglas Green
 Douglas Gropp
 J. Alan Groves
 Elizabeth Groves
 R. Laird Harris
 D. G. Hart
 Philip Edgecumbe Hughes
 Kent Hughes
 Timothy J. Keller
 Rienk Kuiper
 Peter Lillback
 Tremper Longman
 John Gresham Machen
 Allan MacRae
 Dan McCartney
 Jack Miller
 John Murray
 K. Scott Oliphint
 Manuel Ortiz
 Alfred Poirier
 Vern Poythress
 O. Palmer Robertson
 Norman Shepherd
 Moisés Silva
 Ned Bernard Stonehouse
 Lane Tipton
 Carl R. Trueman
 Chad Van Dixhoorn
 Cornelius Van Til
 Bruce Waltke
 Robert Dick Wilson
 Timothy Witmer
 Paul Woolley
 Carlton Wynne
 Edward Joseph Young

Alumni
 Greg Bahnsen
 Susan Wise Bauer
 Alistair Begg
 Ralph Blair
 Robert M. Bowman, Jr.
 Anthony Bradley
 Eugene S. Callender
 Edward John Carnell
 Stafford Carson
 Jack Cottrell
 Percy Crawford
 Glenn Davies, Anglican Archbishop of Sydney
 Chad Van Dixhoorn
 Bob Fu
 Mariano Di Gangi
 John Gerstner
 Michael Goheen
 Bruce L. Gordon
 T. David Gordon
 Wayne Grudem
 Allan Harman
 Edward F. Hills
 Paul Jewett
 James B. Jordan
 John Euiwhan Kim
 Meredith Kline
 William L. Lane
 Peter Leithart
 George Marsden
 Carl McIntire
 J. Ramsey Michaels
 Bruce Miller
 Robert Morey
 Harold Ockenga
 Yun Sun Park
 Richard L. Pratt, Jr.
 W. Stanford Reid
 H. Evan Runner
 Philip Ryken
 Francis Schaeffer
 Moisés Silva
 James Skillen
 Robert Sungenis
 Robert L. Thoburn
 Geoff Thomas
 Kevin Vanhoozer
 Marten Woudstra

Honorary Doctorates
 Alistair Begg
 Glenn N. Davies - An Archbishop in Australia
 Wayne Grudem
 Os Guiness
 David Estrada-Herrero
 Lee Jong-Yun - Founding pastor of Seoul Presbyterian Church, a megachurch in Seoul, Korea
 Won Sang Lee - The late pastor of Korean Central Presbyterian Church, a megachurch in Virginia.
 Oak Han-heum - The late pastor of SaRang Community Church a megachurch in Seoul, Korea.
 James I. Packer - Theologian
 Park Yun-sun - Korean scholar who wrote a commentary on every book of the Bible and taught at Chongshin University and founded Hapdong Theological Seminary.
 James W. Skillen - President of Center for Public Justice
 R.C. Sproul - Theologian
 Joni Eareckson Tada - Christian author and disabilities advocate
 John Templeton - President of John Templeton Foundation
 Stephen Tong - Evangelist and pastor of Messiah Cathedral the largest church in Southeast Asia.
 Paul Wells - President of the Federation of Francophone Evangelical theologians